Mons Officer Cadet School was a British military training establishment for officer cadets in Aldershot from 1942 to 1972, when it was closed and all officer training concentrated at Sandhurst. 

Until 1960, it was known as the Mons Officer Cadet Training Unit. The training course at Mons was for Short Service Officer Cadets, Territorial Army officers, and those joining the Regular Army as graduates. It was relatively short, usually lasting only six months or even less, compared with two years at Sandhurst.

History
Mons Barracks was originally constructed from 1926 to 1927 for the Royal Signals.  In 1939, the Royal Military College, Sandhurst, became the home of 161 Infantry Officer Cadet Training Unit (RMC): that unit moved to Mons Barracks at Aldershot in 1942, and subsequently became known as the "Mons Officer Cadet Training Unit (Aldershot)".  In 1947, the Mons Officer Cadet Training Unit (Aldershot) was re-organised as an OCTU for short service and National Service officer cadets of the technical arms, i.e. officer cadets of the Royal Artillery and Royal Armoured Corps.

In the 1950s, candidates for National Service commissions, which were unlikely to last more than two years, received a cut-down version of officer training, lasting for sixteen weeks, either at the Mons Officer Cadet Training Unit at Aldershot or the Eaton Hall OCTU near Chester.

Shortly before National Service was abolished in 1960, the Mons and Eaton Hall OCTUs were combined to form the Mons Officer Cadet School. Mons was made responsible for training all Short Service Officer Cadets, and for those joining the Regular Army as graduates. Later, Mons also became responsible for final training of candidates for Territorial Army commissions. The intensive training that emphasised cadets' duties as subalterns, rather than as field officers and generals, was fast and efficient, and attractive to potential officers since the course lasted just six months compared to two years at Sandhurst.

Ranulph Fiennes trained at Mons in 1963 and later recalled “Instead of two years at Sandhurst there would be five months concentrated training at Mons Officer Cadet School. At Mons, half of us were white; the rest black, brown and yellow. Everyone got on fine so long as they pulled their weight.”

The Mons OCS was closed in 1972, and its responsibilities transferred to the Royal Military Academy Sandhurst, which was re-organised as an academy for all British Army student officers and officer cadets, including short servicemen, regulars, and Territorials.

Notable graduates
See also :Category:Graduates of the Mons Officer Cadet School
 George E. Mudenda, retired Zambian Army Brigadier-General and Adjutant-General
 Chukwuemeka Odumegwu-Ojukwu, Nigerian Army, Military Governor of the Eastern Region, Leader of the secessionist State of Biafra
Alexander, Crown Prince of Yugoslavia
Sani Abacha, former military President of Nigeria
Hamad ibn Isa Al Khalifa, King of Bahrain
Hamad bin Mohammed Al Sharqi, Hakem of Fujairah
D. W. Hapuarachchi, Major General Sri Lanka Army
Nicholas Soames, Baron Soames of Fletching
Samuel Ogbemudia, Brigadier General, Nigerian Army. Military Administrator of Bendel
Robin Rhoderick-Jones, Brigadier and Author
Akwasi Amankwaa Afrifa, Ghanaian Head of State
Joseph Nanven Garba, Nigerian Army general, diplomat, and politician
George Agbazika Innih. Nigerian Army general and politician
Miles Hunt-Davis, British Army brigadier 
Emmanuel E Ikwue, Nigerian Air Force Chief of the Air Staff
Mohammed Sani Sami, Nigerian Army brigadier and Governor of Bauchi State, Nigeria
John Amadu Bangura, Sierra Leone Army brigadier and acting Governor-General of Sierra Leone
Muhammadu Buhari, Nigerian Army, President of Nigeria.
Olusegun Obasanjo, former Nigerian President and General
Bashiru Jinadu, Nigerian Army Major-General
Kit Lambert, manager of the Who
 Robin Collier MC
Mohammed bin Rashid Al Maktoum, Emir of Dubai, Vice President and Prime Minister of the United Arab Emirates
Tony Hunter-Choat, British soldier who served in the French Foreign Legion
Derek Chanda Mutoni, retired Zambian Army Brigadier-General
David A. Granger, Guyanese Army retired brigadier general, president of Guyana
Michael Heseltine, Deputy Prime Minister
Ranulph Fiennes, explorer
Hassan Usman Katsina, Nigerian Army, Governor of Northern Nigeria, Chief of Army Staff

References

Military training establishments of the United Kingdom
Educational institutions established in 1960
Training establishments of the British Army
1960 establishments in the United Kingdom
Military in Aldershot
Military history of Hampshire
Military academies of the United Kingdom